The Timm Collegiate was a series of American-built two-seat light aircraft of the late 1920s.

Design and development
Otto Timm founded the O.W. Timm Aircraft Corp in 1922 with its base at Glendale, California. The firm changed its name to the Timm Airplane Co in 1928. During 1928 Timm designed the Collegiate series of parasol-winged two-seat light aircraft fitted with fixed tailwheel undercarriage.

Operational history
During their operational lives, several of the six Collegiates were fitted with replacement powerplants, giving rise to new designation numbers. The aircraft served with private pilot owners both pre and post World War II. In 1930, the first Collegiate M-150 NC279V City of Los Angeles set an endurance record of 378 hours in flying the equivalent of 27,677 miles over Rosamond Dry Lake, California.

The FAA civil aircraft register recorded two surviving airworthy examples as at August 2009. One was operated by a private owner in California.  The other NC337 was owned by Albert I. Stix and is on public display in the Historic Aircraft Restoration Museum (HARM) at Dauster Field, Creve Coeur, near St Louis Missouri.  Two other examples are in long term storage in a private collection in Springfield, Oregon.

Variants
(Source : Aerofiles and FAA Registry)

 K-90 c/n 102  Anzani 10: NC887E  stored in Oregon in 2009
 K-100 c/n 101  Kinner K-5 NC337, later re-engined to a model C-165 with a  Comet 7-E. On display at HARM in 2009.
 TW-120 c/n 106  to  Western L-7. NC945Y. No longer extant.
 M-150 c/n 105  McClatchie Panther. NC279V privately owned in California in 2009.  Two further examples later converted to this standard.
 TC-165 c/n 101 C-165 re-engined with Continental A-70. NC337. On display at HARM in 2017.
 TC-165 c/n 104  Continental A-70. NX16E. No longer extant.
 C-165 c/n 101 K-100 re-engined with  Comet 7-E. Later re-engined with 150 h.p McClatchie Panther.
 C-165 c/n 102 K-90 re-engined with  Comet 7-E.
 C-170 c/n 103  Curtiss Challenger, later re-fitted with  Curtiss Challenger. NC888E stored in Oregon in 2009.
 C-185 c/n 103  Curtiss Challenger, NC888E modified from C-170.

Specifications (M-100)

References
Notes

Bibliography

 Ogden, Bob. Aviation Museums and Collections of North America. Tonbridge, Kent, UK: Air-Britain (Historians) Ltd, 2007. .

External links

  Data and photographs of the Timm Collegiate series

1920s United States civil utility aircraft
Collegiate
Parasol-wing aircraft
Single-engined tractor aircraft
Aircraft first flown in 1928